My Baby's Waiting is the debut single of the Irish boy/girl band Industry.   It was #1 in the Irish Singles Chart for the chart of 25 June 2009.  It was in the Irish charts for two weeks.

Charts

References

External links

2009 debut singles
Irish Singles Chart number-one singles
2009 songs